Nichollstown and Berry Islands was a district of the Bahamas.

It consisted of the northern portion of the island of Andros, a population (2000) of 3,444, together with the nearby Berry Islands (population 809).

Since 1996 the Berry Islands have been constituted as a separate district, and with the Nicholls Town area now the district of North Andros.

Former districts of the Bahamas